Selysiothemis nigra, the black pennant, is a monotypic species of dragonfly in the family Libellulidae. It occurs in Central Asia and the Middle East. In Europe it is mostly confined to the coastal areas of the Mediterranean and the Black Sea.

References

Sources

Libellulidae
Insects described in 1825
Taxa named by Pierre Léonard Vander Linden